Imbleville is a commune in the Seine-Maritime department in the Normandy region in north-western France.

Geography

Population

Places of interest
 The church of St.Jean-Baptiste, dating from the twelfth century.
 The fifteenth-century château de Bilmorel.

See also
Communes of the Seine-Maritime department

References

Communes of Seine-Maritime